Sepharad ( or ;  Səp̄āraḏ; also Sefarad, Sephared, Sfard) is the Hebrew name for the Iberian peninsula. A place called Sepharad, probably referring to Sardis in Lydia ('Sfard' in Lydian), in the Book of Obadiah (6th century BC) of the Hebrew Bible. The name was later applied to Spain and is analogous to Tzarfat or Ashkenaz.

Version comparisons
 Obadiah 1:20 (trans. Judaica Press) "And this exiled host of the children of Israel who are [with] the Canaanites as far as Zarephath and the exile of Jerusalem which is in Sepharad shall inherit the cities of the southland"
 Obadiah 1:20 (NKJV) "And the captivity of this host of the children of Israel, that are among the Canaanites, even unto Zarephath, and the captivity of Jerusalem, that is in Sepharad, shall possess the cities of the South."
 Obadiah 1:20 (Vulgate) et transmigratio exercitus huius filiorum Israhel omnia Chananeorum usque ad Saraptham et transmigratio Hierusalem quae in Bosforo est possidebit civitates austri.
 Abdias 1:20 (Douay-Rheims) "And the captivity of this host of the children of Israel, all the places of the Chanaanites even to Sarepta: and the captivity of Jerusalem that is in Bosphorus, shall possess the cities of the south."

See also
 Sephardic law and customs

References

External links

 Judaism: Sephardim,  Jewish Virtual Library

 Sephardim, Foundation for the Advancement of Sephardic Studies and Culture

 Roots of Sefarad, Jewish Heritage in Spain and Portugal (travel agency)

 Sefarad, Journal on Hebraic, Sephardim and Middle East Studies, ILC, CSIC (scientific articles in Spanish, English and other languages)

Anatolia
Hebrew Bible places
Hebrew words and phrases
Jewish Portuguese history
Jewish Spanish history
Judaism in Spain
Sephardi Jews topics
Historical regions